Nebo ( Nəḇō; also Nabo, Nebai, Nobai) is a town name mentioned in several passages of the Hebrew Bible (or Old Testament of Christianity). It is used for two towns, one in the territory assigned in the Bible to the Tribe of Reuben, and another in that of the Tribe of Judah.

In the same chapter, verse 38, it is again mentioned between Cariathaim and Baal-meon, and it is found associated with the same names on the Mesha Stele (line 14). These and other indications show that the town was situated in the vicinity of Mount Nebo; its exact location is identified with Khirbet al-Mukhayyat. It belonged to the rich pasture lands which the tribes of Reuben and Gad asked of Moses in the distribution of the territory (Numbers 32). The town had reverted to the Moabites at the time when Isaiah prophesied against it (Isaiah 15:2; cf. Jeremiah 48:1, 22). The Mesha Stele (lines 14-18) boasts of having taken it from the Israelites. According to Saint Jerome, the sanctuary of the idol Chemosh was in Nebo.

See also
Isaiah 15

References

Torah cities
Tribe of Reuben